The 1906–07 Manitoba Professional Hockey League (MPHL) season would see the 1906 MPHL champion Kenora Thistles challenge the Montreal Wanderers in a Stanley Cup challenge in January and win the MPHL championship, only to lose the Cup in a challenge in March.

Regular season 
The Winnipeg Hockey Club and Winnipeg Victorias left the league which now accepted professionals openly. The teams organized an amateur league.

Teams played ten games, except for Kenora, which played the Stanley Cup challenge. As a consequence, the standings were adjusted to account for the challenge.

After the Thistles won the Stanley Cup in Montreal, the team played exhibitions in Ottawa and Toronto. In the Ottawa game Billy McGimsie suffered a career-ending shoulder injury. At the time, it was not described as serious, only a "badly bruised and slightly dislocated shoulder". He played in the Thistles' next exhibition in Toronto on January 25. The team signed Fred Whitcroft to replace him. Kenora signed Alf Smith and Rat Westwick of Ottawa, whose season with the ECAHA was already over, for the final game of the season and the playoffs to play in place of future Hall of Famers Art Ross and Joe Hall who were back playing for Brandon.

Source: Zwieg, 2012

Playoff 

Kenora would play and win the MPHL playoff against Brandon to successfully defend the Cup, winning a best-of-three series 2–0. Hall and Ross played for Brandon in the series, while Smith, Westwick and Whitcroft played for the Thistles. At the time of the series, the acting Stanley Cup trustee William Foran had already declared Smith and Westwick ineligible for the challenge series. After the series was over, the Manitoba League registered their disapproval over Mr. Foran's decision to exclude the players.

- Goal scorers in both games are unknown

Stanley Cup challenges 
As the Thistles were Manitoba champions for 1906, they were accepted as Stanley Cup challengers. However, the challenge did not take place until January 1907.

Wanderers vs. Kenora at Montreal 

The Thistles played the Montreal Wanderers in a Stanley Cup challenge during the season, defeating the Wanderers 4–2 and 8–6 on January 17–21. Aided by future Hockey Hall of Famers Tom Hooper, Tommy Phillips, and Art Ross, the Thistles came away with 4–2 and 8–6 victories for a combined score of 12–8 to win a two-game total goals series. A "ringer", Ross was a member of the Brandon Wheat City team and was signed by Kenora for just the challenge games. Brandon's Joe Hall also signed for the challenge games and returned to Brandon afterward.

Wanderers vs. Kenora at Winnipeg 

Kenora went ahead and used Alf Smith and Rat Westwick of Ottawa for the challenge, against the wishes of Stanley Cup trustee Mr. Foran. The series was supposed to start on March 21 in Kenora, but Montreal protested the use of Smith and Westwick, and also wanted to play the series in Winnipeg. Foran ruled that both players were ineligible. The clubs went ahead and started the series on March 23 in Winnipeg. Mr. Foran was notified by the press (inaccurately) that Montreal had dropped its protest and that the clubs intended to play anyway. Mr. Foran threatened to take the Cup back to Ottawa:

If the two clubs ignore the instructions of the cup trustees by mutually agreeing to play against Westwick and Smith when both were positively informed these men were ineligible to participate in the present cup matches, the series will be treated as void, and the cup will be taken charge of by the trustees. It will remain in their possession till the various hockey leagues can educate themselves up to a standard where decent sport will be the order of the day.”

The teams went ahead and played the series. However, Mr. Foran changed his mind after the Wanderers won the Cup, stating that the Wanderers could keep the Cup, because they had not rescinded their protest.

Kenora Thistles - January–March 1907 Stanley Cup champions

See also 
 1907 ECAHA season
 List of Stanley Cup champions

References 
Bibliography
 
 Podnieks, Andrew: Lord Stanley Cup, Fenn Publishing Company, 2004
 

Notes

Manitoba Hockey Association seasons
Man